DYES may refer to:
 DYES-AM, an AM radio station broadcasting in Borongan, branded as Radyo Pilipinas
 DYES-FM, an FM radio station broadcasting in Cebu City, branded as Easy Rock